Salehan (also Romanized as Şāleḩān) is a village in Kabgian Rural District, Kabgian District, Dana County, Kohgiluyeh and Boyer-Ahmad Province, Iran. At the 2006 census, its population was 630, in 131 families.

References 

Populated places in Dana County